The 1998 Baltimore Orioles season involved the Orioles finishing 4th in the American League East with a record of 79 wins and 83 losses, the first of 14 consecutive losing seasons.

Offseason
December 11, 1997: Doug Drabek was signed as a free agent with the Baltimore Orioles.
December 12, 1997: Joe Carter was signed as a free agent with the Baltimore Orioles.

Regular season

On September 29, 1998, Ryan Minor would make his Major League debut, replacing Cal Ripken Jr. in the Orioles lineup.
The 1998 Baltimore Orioles season marks the last time a team other than the New York Yankees had the highest payroll in baseball until 2013, when New York was surpassed by the Los Angeles Dodgers.

Season standings

Record vs. opponents

Notable transactions
June 2, 1998: Cliff Lee was drafted by the Baltimore Orioles in the 20th round of the 1998 amateur draft, but did not sign.
June 16, 1998: Rich Becker was selected off waivers by the Baltimore Orioles from the New York Mets.
 July 23, 1998: Joe Carter was traded by the Baltimore Orioles to the San Francisco Giants for Darin Blood (minors).

All good things must come to an end
In June, Cal Ripken Jr. began to contemplate ending his still-active, record-breaking streak of consecutive games played.  However, the Orioles were still in contention for a wild-card spot in the playoffs at that point, so he continued playing.   By mid-September, after the team fell out of wild-card contention, Ripken decided that, since the games that began his streak (May 30, 1982), tied Lou Gehrig's old record of 2,130 games (September 5, 1995) and surpassed it (September 6, 1995) all took place in his Baltimore hometown, it would be most appropriate to bring his incredible run to a close at home also.  Thus, on September 20, after playing 2,632 games without a break, Cal Ripken Jr. asked to be taken out of the starting lineup for the Orioles' last home game of the season against the New York Yankees.  Everybody was stunned when rookie Ryan Minor took third base instead of Ripken for the start of the game.  The game's first batter, New York's Chuck Knoblauch, grounded out to shortstop for the first out, officially ending Ripken's streak and prompting both teams and the fans to give "The Iron Man" a thunderous ovation for his monumental achievement.

Roster

Player stats

Batting

Starters by position
Note: Pos = Position; G = Games played; AB = At bats; H = Hits; Avg. = Batting average; HR = Home runs; RBI = Runs batted in

Other batters
Note: G = Games played; AB = At bats; H = Hits; Avg. = Batting average; HR = Home runs; RBI = Runs batted in

Pitching

Starting pitchers
Note: G = Games pitched; IP = Innings pitched; W = Wins; L = Losses; ERA = Earned run average; SO = Strikeouts

Other pitchers
Note: G = Games pitched; IP = Innings pitched; W = Wins; L = Losses; ERA = Earned run average; SO = Strikeouts

Relief pitchers
Note: G = Games pitched; W = Wins; L = Losses; SV = Saves; ERA = Earned run average; SO = Strikeouts

Farm system

References

1998 Baltimore Orioles team page at Baseball Reference
1998 Baltimore Orioles season at baseball-almanac.com

Baltimore Orioles seasons
Baltimore Orioles Season, 1998
Baltimore